B. B. Dutta (8 March 1938 – 27 September 2021) was an Indian politician from Meghalaya, British Raj. He was the General Secretary of Meghalaya Pradesh Congress Committee (1978-1989) and edited a few publications. He was nominated as member of the Rajya Sabha in 1993 and served till 1999. He died following a brief illness on 27 September 2021.

References

External links
 Brief Biodata

1938 births
2021 deaths
Meghalaya politicians
Nominated members of the Rajya Sabha
People from Shillong